Xenophon of Robeika ( - Xenofont Robeysky; died June 28, 1262) was a Russian Orthodox monk, later declared a saint.  A student of Barlaam of Khutyn, he later became abbot of the Khutyn Monastery.  Resigning from this post, he later founded the Trinity Monastery on the Robeika River (ru), close to Novgorod; he died there in 1262.

References
 biography on OCA site

Year of birth missing
1262 deaths
13th-century Christian saints
Russian saints